The siege of Claudiopolis was a Byzantine victory over a Seljuq Turk army in February–March 1179.

Background
After the Byzantine annihilation of a Seljuq Turkish army at the Battle of Hyelion and Leimocheir in 1177, the Byzantines laid waste to Turkish lands along the Meander river. Emperor Manuel I Komnenos drove out Turkish forces encamped near Lakerion and Panasion. A Byzantine attempt to capture the town of Charax failed when the Byzantine commander, Andronikos Doukas Angelos, panicked after facing a few Turks in the night and led his entire force in a rout.

Siege
In February 1179, the Turks laid siege to the town of Claudiopolis in northern Bithynia. The Byzantine garrison was prevented from sallying out. The defending forces threatened the emperor with a capitulation unless prompt help arrived, claiming to not have the strength to withstand a siege attack or starvation blockade. Manuel set out for Claudiopolis with an army a day after receiving the message. He proceeded via Nicomedia, with only his horse and armor, unburdened by imperial luxuries. The emperor slept little and rested on the ground, earning him the admiration of his men. Upon catching sight of the approaching Byzantine banners and glittering armaments, the surprised Turks turned tail and fled. Manuel did not let up, pursuing them back to their lands.

Aftermath
The Byzantine success demonstrated that the frontier in Anatolia remained intact. Manuel concluded an advantageous peace with the Seljuqs by the end of 1179.

Citations

References

Primary

Secondary

Sieges of the Byzantine–Seljuk wars
Conflicts in 1179
Sieges involving the Byzantine Empire
Sieges involving the Sultanate of Rum
1179 in Asia
1170s in the Byzantine Empire
Manuel I Komnenos
Byzantine Bithynia